The 1999–2000 season was the 31st campaign of the Scottish Men's National League, the national basketball league of Scotland. The season featured 10 teams; from the previous season, Aberdeen Buccaneers joined the league and Glasgow Gators did not return. St Mirren won their first league title. There were end of season playoffs for the first time in several seasons, with St Mirren beating City of Edinburgh Kings 2–1 in the final series.

Teams

The line-up for the 1999–2000 season featured the following teams:

Aberdeen Buccaneers
Boroughmuir
City of Edinburgh Kings
Clark Erikkson Fury
Dunfermline Reign
Glasgow d2
Midlothian Bulls
Paisley
St Mirren McDonalds
Troon Tornadoes

League table

 Source: Scottish National League 1999-00 - Britball

Playoffs
Despite finishing second in the league, Glasgow d2 chose not to compete in the playoffs.

Quarter-finals

Semi-finals

Final

 Source: Scottish Championship Playoffs 1999-00 - Britball

References

Scottish Basketball Championship Men seasons
basketball
basketball